Blossom & Bee is a studio album by American jazz singer Sara Gazarek released on June 19, 2012 by Palmetto Records. All the tracks are cover versions except "Blossom & Bee," which Gazarek wrote with producer Larry Goldings and Bill DeMain, and "Fly Away Birdie," which she wrote with pianist Josh Nelson. Seven of the twelve songs on this album have been recorded by Blossom Dearie. The album debuted No. 18 on the Billboard Jazz Album chart.

Critical reception 
Blossom & Bee received positive reviews. C. Michael Bailey from All About Jazz wrote ".. truly exceptional ... an inventive coupling of the old and new." Brent Black from CriticalJazz gave 5 stars, writing: "A flawless recording by all participants, and easily one of the most impressive releases of the year, across any genre. 5 huge stars!" Andrea Canter from Jazz Police praised the album "...if Sara Gazarek's earlier recordings signaled the potential of a mighty talent, then her latest confirms her place at the top..." Mark S. Tucker from FAME wrote "...get in on the secret before it ignites a wave of astonished approval from all corners."

Track listing

Personnel 
 Sara Gazarek - vocals, glockenspiel
 Josh Nelson - piano, keyboards
 Larry Goldings - piano, melodica & organ
 John Pizzarelli - vocals & guitar
 Hamilton Price - bass
 Zach Harmon - drums

Charts

References 

Sara Gazarek albums
2012 albums